The following lists events that happened during 1855 in Australia.

Incumbents

Governors
Governors of the Australian colonies:
Governor of New South Wales – Sir Charles Augustus FitzRoy
Governor of South Australia – Sir Richard MacDonnell (from 8 June)
Lieutenant-Governor of Van Diemen's Land – Henry Young (from 8 January)
Lieutenant-Governor of Victoria (Governor of Victoria from 22 May) – Sir Charles Hotham (until 10 November)
Governor of Western Australia as a Crown Colony – Captain Charles Fitzgerald, then Sir Arthur Kennedy.

Events
 12 June - the Victorian parliament passed the Chinese Restriction Act in an effort to restrict Chinese immigration. These restrictions, including a £10 poll tax on Chinese and a limit to Chinese passengers per tonnage of shipping. 
 8 September – Queen Victoria signs an Order in Council to change the name of Van Diemen's Land to Tasmania.
 26 September – Sydney to Parramatta railway opened

Births

 30 January – George Edwards, New South Wales politician (d. 1911)
 16 February – Henry Saunders, Western Australian politician (born in the United Kingdom) (d. 1919)
 28 May – Sir William Portus Cullen, New South Wales politician and 7th Chief Justice of New South Wales (d. 1935)
 18 June – George Lewis Becke, trader and writer (d. 1913)
 6 August – Sir Isaac Isaacs, 9th Governor-General of Australia and 3rd Chief Justice of Australia (d. 1948)
 13 August – William Astley, short story writer (born in the United Kingdom) (d. 1911)
 25 August – Paddy Glynn, South Australian politician (born in Ireland) (d. 1931)
 28 October – Francis James Gillen, anthropologist and ethnologist (d. 1912)
 22 November – Pharez Phillips, Victorian politician (d. 1914)

Deaths

 23 January – John Burdett Wittenoom, clergyman (born in the United Kingdom) (b. 1788)
 19 March – Thomas Bock, artist (born in the United Kingdom) (b. 1790)
 3 April – John Bateman, merchant and whaler (born in the United Kingdom) (b. 1789)
 31 December – Sir Charles Hotham, 1st Governor of Victoria (born in the United Kingdom) (b. 1806)

References 

 
Australia
Years of the 19th century in Australia